Rhaphidura lowii is a species of plant in the family Rubiaceae, the sole species in the monotypic genus Rhaphidura. It is endemic to Borneo, where is known only from Sarawak state.

References

Endemic flora of Borneo
Flora of Sarawak
Urophylleae